Nicki Parrott (pronounced pa-ROTT) is a jazz vocalist and bass player from Australia.

Background 
Parrott took piano lessons when she was four years old, then learned flute. When she was fifteen, she started playing double bass, and after graduating from high school she studied at the New South Wales Conservatorium of Music in Sydney, Australia. While in school, she performed with Australian musicians Dale Barlow and Mike Nock and with American musicians Chuck Findley and Bobby Shew.

Career
She moved to New York City in 1994 and continued her education on bass with Rufus Reid. Her teachers also included Ray Brown and John Clayton. For several years she played bass guitar and sang backing vocals for an R&B band in Manhattan. She started a trio with John Tropea and David Spinozza. In 2000, she became the bassist for Les Paul in his trio's weekly performances at a club in Manhattan. She appeared in two documentaries about Paul: Chasing Sound and Thank You, Les.

Parrott recorded her first album, Awabakal Suite (2001), with her sister, Lisa Parrott. She had roles on Broadway in the musicals Jekyll & Hyde and You're a Good Man, Charlie Brown. Her first solo album, Moon River, was released in 2008 and consisted of jazz standards. She has recorded tribute albums to Burt Bacharach, Nat King Cole, Doris Day, Blossom Dearie, Peggy Lee, and the  Carpenters.

Awards and honors
 Best Vocal Album, Swing Journal, Moon River, 2007; Fly Me to the Moon, 2008
 Golden Disc Award, Swing Journal, Black Coffee, 2010

Discography

As leader
 Awabakal Suite with Lisa Parrott (Monkey Pants, 2004)
 Moon River (Venus, 2007)
 People Will Say We're in Love with Rossano Sportiello (Arbors, 2007)
 Do It Again with Rossano Sportiello (Arbors, 2009)
 Fly Me to the Moon (Venus, 2009)
 Black Coffee (Venus, 2010)
 Can't Take My Eyes Off You (Venus, 2011)
 Like a Lover with Ken Peplowski (Venus, 2011)
 Sakura Sakura (Venus, 2012)
 Summertime (Venus, 2012)
 Autumn Leaves (Venus, 2012)
 Winter Wonderland (Venus, 2012)
 Live at the Jazz Corner with Rossano Sportiello, Eddie Metz (Arbors, 2012)
 The Last Time I Saw Paris (Venus, 2013)
 The Look of Love (Venus, 2014)
 Angel Eyes (Venus, 2014)
 It's a Good Day with Rossano Sportiello, Eddie Metz (Arbors, 2014)
 Sentimental Journey (Venus, 2015)
 Two Songbirds of a Feather with Rebecca Kilgore (Arbors, 2015)
 From Joplin to Jobim with Engelbert Wrobel, Paolo Alderighi, Stephanie Trick (Wrobel, 2016)
 Yesterday Once More: The Carpenters Song Book (Venus, 2016)
 Strictly Confidential with Rossano Sportiello, Eddie Metz (Arbors, 2016)
 Dear Blossom (Arbors, 2017)
 Unforgettable (Venus, 2017)
 Mambo to Tango (Wrobel, 2018)
 Close to You (Venus, 2018)
 Stompin' at the Savoy: A Tribute To Ella & Louis with Byron Stripling (Venus, 2018)
 New York to Paris (Arbors, 2019)
 If You Could Read My Mind (Arbors, 2021)
 Great 70's (Venus, 2021)

As guest
With David Krakauer
 A New Hot One (Label Bleu, 2000)
 The Twelve Tribes (Label Bleu, 2002)
 Live in Krakow (Label Bleu, 2003)
 Bubbemeises (Label Bleu, 2005)

With Chuck Redd
 For George, Cole, and Duke (Blue Heron, 2014)
 Groove City (Dalphine, 2018)

With others
 Muriel Anderson, Wildcat (2005)
 Johnny Frigo, Johnny Frigo's DNA Exposed! (Arbors, 2001)
 Skitch Henderson & Bucky Pizzarelli, Legends (Arbors, 2003)
 Rebecca Kilgore, The Music of Jimmy Van Heusen (Jump, 2005)
 Ken Peplowski, Sunrise (Arbors, 2018)
 Randy Sandke - Unconventional Wisdom (Arbors, 2008)
 Antti Sarpila, We'd Like New York...In June! (Arbors, 2009)
 Derek Smith, High Energy (Arbors, 2001)
 Warren Vaché-John Allred Quintet, Jubilation (Arbors, 2008)
 Johnny Varro, All That Jazz (Arbors, 2001)
 Deborah Weisz, Grace (Va Wah, 2005)
 John Wetton, Les Paul and His Trio, New York Minute (2015)
 Rachel Z, First Time Ever I Saw Your Face (2003)

References

External links
 Official site

1970 births
Australian jazz singers
Australian jazz double-bassists
Venus Records artists
Living people
21st-century double-bassists
Women double-bassists
20th-century double-bassists
20th-century Australian women singers
21st-century Australian women singers
Arbors Records artists